The Memorial Van Coningsloo (also named Memorial Philippe Van Coningsloo) is a European single day cycle race held each year with the start in Wavre and finish in Rijmenam. The race was first organized in 1993 to commemorate local amateur cyclist Philippe Van Coningsloo, who suffered a heart attack and died during a cycling race in 1992. As of 2013, the race is organized as a 1.2 event on the UCI Europe Tour.

Winners

References

External links
 

Cycle races in Belgium
UCI Europe Tour races
Recurring sporting events established in 1993
1993 establishments in Belgium
Wavre